Lensbygda is a village in Østre Toten Municipality in Innlandet county, Norway.

References

External links

Lensbygda Sports Club

Østre Toten
Villages in Innlandet